Marcos Alfonso Lavado Mora (born August 22, 1991) is a Venezuelan swimmer. At the 2012 Summer Olympics, he competed in the Men's 200 metre butterfly, finishing in 27th place overall in the heats, failing to qualify for the semifinals, and was also part of the Venezuelan 4 x 100 m team. He was born in Barquisimeto.  He was part of the Venezuelan team that won bronze in the men's 4 x 200 m freestyle relay at the 2011 Pan American Games.

References

External links

Venezuelan male swimmers
1991 births
Living people
Olympic swimmers of Venezuela
Swimmers at the 2012 Summer Olympics
Male butterfly swimmers
Swimmers at the 2015 Pan American Games
Swimmers at the 2011 Pan American Games
Pan American Games medalists in swimming
Pan American Games bronze medalists for Venezuela
Central American and Caribbean Games medalists in swimming
Central American and Caribbean Games gold medalists for Venezuela
Competitors at the 2018 Central American and Caribbean Games
Medalists at the 2011 Pan American Games
Sportspeople from Barquisimeto
21st-century Venezuelan people